Congo is an unincorporated community in Cherokee County, Alabama, United States.

History
A post office called Congo was established in 1892, and remained in operation until it was discontinued in 1909. The name commemorates the expeditions made by David Livingstone to the African Congo.

References

Unincorporated communities in Cherokee County, Alabama
Unincorporated communities in Alabama